Caldanaerobacter uzonensis  is a thermophilic, anaerobic and heterotrophic bacterium from the genus of Caldanaerobacter which has been isolated from a hot spring in Uzon Caldera in Russia.

References

 

Thermoanaerobacterales
Bacteria described in 2010
Thermophiles
Anaerobes